Jenny Johnson (born Jenny Zinkan-McGrade January 9, 1979 in Duncan, British Columbia) is a former field hockey midfielder from Canada. She earned a total number of 85 international caps for the Canadian Women's National Team during her career. In 1997 Johnson was named in the British Columbia Sport Hall of Fame as the Female High School Athlete of the Year.

International Senior Tournaments
 1998 – Commonwealth Games, Kuala Lumpur, Malaysia (not ranked)
 1999 – Pan American Games, Winnipeg, Canada (3rd)
 2001 – Pan American Cup, Kingston, Jamaica (3rd)
 2001 – World Cup Qualifier, Amiens/Abbeville, France (10th)
 2002 – Commonwealth Games, Manchester, England (7th)

References

External links
 Profile on Field Hockey Canada

1979 births
Living people
Canadian female field hockey players
Field hockey people from British Columbia
Field hockey players at the 1998 Commonwealth Games
Field hockey players at the 2002 Commonwealth Games
People from Duncan, British Columbia
Pan American Games medalists in field hockey
Pan American Games bronze medalists for Canada
Field hockey players at the 1999 Pan American Games
Medalists at the 1999 Pan American Games
Commonwealth Games competitors for Canada